GHP may refer to:

 Gandhi Heritage Portal
 Gas hydrate pingo, a submarine landform
 Georgia Governor's Honors Program, in the state of Georgia, in the United States
 Geothermal heat pump
 GHP formalism, in general relativity
 Go Home Productions, a British bootlegger
 Great Hungarian Plain
 Green Highways Partnership, in the United States
 The Greenhouse Project, in Uganda
 Greater Houston Partnership, in Texas, United States